The Lake Chelan Mirror is a weekly newspaper published Wednesdays in Chelan, Washington, United States. It covers Lake Chelan, Manson, Chelan, Entiat and the surrounding area, with a circulation of 2,900. It is owned by NCW Media Inc., along with the Leavenworth Echo, the Cashmere Valley Record, the Quad City Herald, and the Wenatchee Business Journal.

History 

 1891 De Witt C Britt
 Chelan mining district
 started as a liberal republican paper then joined forces with the free silver party which was common among papers in western mining districts
 1892 moved plant to Chelan and continued publication under the name the Chelan Leader
 Early issues were difficult to get off the ground, published first issue a month late, missed a few issues.
 1908 open letter in Wenatchee Daily World accuses editor of misrepresentation
 1909 editor is sick
 Editor dies April 20
 C. E. Goodsell - editor and owner (around 1920)
 Lake Chelan News subscriptions, advertising, news, continues in the Leader
 1937 W.B. Gavin buys Lake Chelan Mirror with the help of his boss from The Cashmere Valley Record
 1973 son Rick Gavin becomes publisher
2000 Rick Gavin and wife Kristine Gavin sell newspaper to Prairie Media, now NCW Media (Washington Newspaper March 2012)
 Obituary of longtime owner Babe Gavin, 1999
 Sold by Gavin family in 2009.
2016 Lake Chelan Mirror celebrates 125th anniversary in August

References

Resources & links 
 Chelan Falls Leader (1891 - 1892) LOC entry
 D.C. Britt
 Chelan Leader (1892 - 1925) LOC entry
 Chelan Valley Mirror (1925 - 1991) LOC entry
 Library of Congress entry
 The Washington Newspaper - March 2012 Edition
 Washington State Library - List of State Newspapers

External links 
 Official website

Newspapers published in Washington (state)
Chelan County, Washington